Pioneer Justice is a 1947 American Western film directed by Ray Taylor and starring Lash La Rue, Al St. John, and Jennifer Holt. The film was released by Producers Releasing Corporation on June 28, 1947. The film was shot at the Iverson Movie Ranch.

Plot
Cheyenne and Fuzzy help Betty Walters keep her ranch against a mysterious villain, his gang of henchmen and a crooked sheriff by dispensing justice.

Cast
Lash La Rue as Cheyenne Davis (as 'Lash' La Rue)
Al St. John as Fuzzy Jones (as Al 'Fuzzy' St. John)
Jennifer Holt as Betty Walters
William Fawcett as Uncle Bob
Jack Ingram as	Bill Judd
 Terry Frost as Gambler Grayson
 Dee Cooper  as Criler
Lane Bradford as Joe
 Henry Hall as Sheriff Peters
 Steve Drake as Al Walters
Slim Whitaker as the Bartender
 Bob Woodward as Deputy Jackson
 Wally West 	... 	Buck Crowder

References

External links

1947 Western (genre) films
American Western (genre) films
1947 films
American black-and-white films
Producers Releasing Corporation films
Films directed by Ray Taylor
1940s American films